The South American Indoor Championships in Athletics is a biennial indoor track and field competition for athletes from South America, organised by CONSUDATLE. The first edition was staged in 2020, making it the third continent to organise such an event (following the European Athletics Indoor Championships in 1966 and Asian Indoor Athletics Championships in 2004). It is the indoor counterpart to the biennial South American Championships in Athletics.

Editions

Participation
Eleven member federations of CONSUDATLE have participated in the championships.

Championships records

Men

Women

References

External links

 
Athletics
Continental athletics championships
Athletics Indoor
Biennial athletics competitions